William "Bill" Craig Martin (1956 – 27 April 2016) was an Australian sociologist. He was Professor of Sociology at Flinders University and the University of Queensland and was an editor of the Journal of Sociology. His main research interests were in the sociology of work and employment.

Early life and education 
Bill Martin was born in 1956 to Jean Isobel Martin (née Craig) and Allan William Martin. Both his parents were academics, Jean a sociologist and Allan a historian. Martin completed a BA (Honours) at the Australian National University in 1977. He undertook a PhD at the University of Wisconsin–Madison under Iván Szelényi and Erik Olin Wright, his degree being conferred in 1988.

Career 
Martin returned to Australia to take up a position at La Trobe University. In 1992 he began a 17-year tenure at Flinders University, during which he worked in the Sociology Department and the National Institute of Labour Studies (NILS) and attained the position of Professor of Sociology. In 2009 he took up the position of Professor of Sociology and Program Leader of the Employment and Education research program at the Institute for Social Science Research (ISSR) at the University of Queensland. Martin retired in 2015.

During his career Martin was an editor of the Journal of Sociology and treasurer of The Australian Sociological Association.

Death 
Martin died on 27 April 2016, after a short illness.

Bibliography

Books 
   Pdf.
   Pdf.
  
  
  Pdf.

Chapters in books

Journal articles 
 
 
 
  EBSCOhost.
 
  Pdf.
  Pdf.

References

External links 
 Profile page: Bill Martin Institute for Social Science Research (ISSR), The University of Queensland
 Profile page: Bill Martin Researchers, The University of Queensland
 Profile page: Bill Martin Flinders University

Australian sociologists
Academic staff of Flinders University
Academic staff of the University of Queensland
Date of birth missing
Place of birth missing
1956 births
2016 deaths
Australian National University alumni
University of Wisconsin–Madison alumni
Academics from Brisbane